"Wendy" is a song written by Brian Wilson and Mike Love for the American rock band the Beach Boys. It was released on their 1964 album All Summer Long and was also featured on their EP, Four by The Beach Boys.

Composition
"Wendy" was originally credited to just Brian Wilson. Mike Love's name was added as a result of a lawsuit filed by him against Wilson in the 1990s. In a 2007 interview, Wilson commented of the song,

The opening chords are whole notes played on electric guitar and bass. The song begins with a minor i chord in the key of D minor, moves to a major IV, comes back to the minor i, and then moves to a major VI chord, a IV in the key of F. The song then modulates to the key of F major (the relative major of D minor) through a substituted plagal cadence, using a I-ii progression to solidify the new tonic of F.

The verse begins with another I-IV-I progression, ending on an IV chord in the first line. The second line begins the same as the first, but moves to a major ♭VII (in D minor the neapolitan chord), and then modulates to the relative minor through use of a iii chord (A minor, the V in the key of D minor), the A minor moving to a D minor via an authentic cadence. The chorus/bridge ("I never thought a guy could cry") uses the same chord progression found in the introduction (D: i-iv-i-VI(IV in F), coming back to the key of F for the final line. This repeats for the second verse, before going into the organ solo.

After the second chorus, the song modulates again from F to D minor, this time through the usage of the ♭VII (E♭ major), which is a tritone substitution for the V of D. The solo follows the same general progression of the introduction and chorus. Another run of the verse/chorus follows, and the song then fades out with repeated I-IV cadences.

Personnel
Per Craig Slownski.

The Beach Boys
Al Jardine – harmony and backing vocals, electric rhythm guitars, bass guitar
Mike Love – lead and bass vocals
Brian Wilson – chorus falsetto lead vocals, harmony and backing vocals, upright or grand piano, Hammond B3 organ, producer, arranger
Carl Wilson – harmony and backing vocals, electric lead guitars
Dennis Wilson – harmony and backing vocals, drums
Production staff
Chuck Britz – engineer

Live performances
On September 27, 1964, the group performed "Wendy" as well as "I Get Around" on The Ed Sullivan Show. It was also a staple of the band's 50th Anniversary Tour setlist. Bruce Johnston sang the lead vocal during these performances, rather than Love.

Alternate releases

"Wendy" peaked at No. 44 on the Billboard Hot 100, at No. 36 in Germany and at No. 5 in Switzerland in July 1967 when it was nominally the B-side of "Good Vibrations" — as it was everywhere outside the US.

Cover versions

2017 - Bill DeMain, "Transatlantic Romantic"

References

1964 songs
The Beach Boys songs
Songs written by Brian Wilson
Songs written by Mike Love
Song recordings produced by Brian Wilson